Mayi is a surname. Notable people with the surname include:

Kévin Mayi (born 1993), French football player 
Wuta Mayi (born 1949), Congolese recording artist, composer, and vocalist